Nan or NAN may refer to:

Places

China

 Nan County, Yiyang, Hunan, China
 Nan Commandery, historical commandery in Hubei, China

Thailand
 Nan Province
 Nan, Thailand, the administrative capital of Nan Province
 Nan River

People

Given name
Nan Cross (1928–2007), South African anti-apartheid and anti-conscription activist
Nan Hayworth (born 1959), former U.S. Representative from New York's 19th Congressional District
Nan Wood Honeyman, (1881–1970), first woman elected to the U.S. Congress from Oregon
Nan Hu, Chinese physician-scientist, molecular geneticist, and cancer epidemiologist 
Nan Kempner (1930–2005), New York socialite
Nan Martin (1927–2010), American actress
Nan Grogan Orrock (born 1943), member of the Georgia House of Representatives and State Senator
Nan Phelps (1904–1990), American folk artist
Nan Rich (born 1942), member of the Florida Senate and former member of the House of Representatives
Nan C. Robertson (1926–2009), Pulitzer Prize-winning American journalist, author and teacher
Nan A. Talese (born 1933), American editor

Chinese name
Nan Huai-Chin (1918–2012), Buddhist teacher in China
Nan Song (disambiguation)
Nan Zhang (actress) (born 1986), Chinese-American actress
King Nan of Zhou (r. 314–256 BC), last ruler of the Chinese Zhou dynasty
Luo Nan (born 1986), Chinese swimmer
Sima Nan (born 1956), Chinese television pundit and journalist
Song Nan (born 1990), Chinese figure skater
Wang Nan (disambiguation)
Yu Nan (born 1978), Chinese actress
Zhang Nan (disambiguation)
Zhou Nan (born 1927), Chinese politician and diplomat

Family name
Nan (surname) (南), Chinese surname
Mohd Fauzi Nan (born 1980), Malaysian football player

Nickname
Nan Britton (1896–1991), mistress of President Warren G. Harding
Nannerl O. Keohane (born 1940), American political theorist and former president of Wellesley College and Duke University
Nan Merriman (1920–2012), American operatic singer

Fictional people
Nan (American Horror Story)

Other
English familiar term for grandmother

Arts and entertainment
 Nan, a play by the English poet John Masefield, first produced in 1908, also known as The Tragedy of Nan
 Nan, nickname of the character Joanie Taylor, from the Catherine Tate Show

Organisations
 National Action Network, American civil rights organization
 Nishnawbe Aski Nation
 Northern Access Network, an unlicensed television system in Canada launched in the late 1970s by David Brough

Science and technology
 NaN (not a number), used in computer arithmetic and defined in the IEEE floating-point standard
 NaN (congress), 20th Chaos Communication Congress in 2003
 NAN-190, a drug and research chemical widely used in scientific studies
 Near-me area network, a communication network that focuses on wireless communication among devices in close proximity
 Neighborhood Aware Networking, in Android O
 NMDA Antagonist Neurotoxicity, a potential form of brain damage
 Sodium azide, a chemical compound with the formula NaN3

Other uses
 News Agency of Nigeria
 Norwegian Air Norway
 Southern Min (ISO 639-3 language code nan), a language originated from China
 Nadi International Airport (IATA code NAN), Fiji
 Tandyr nan, Uzbek flatbread

See also
Naan (disambiguation)